The Compact of Free Association (COFA) is an international agreement establishing and governing the relationships of free association between the United States and the three Pacific Island sovereign states of the Federated States of Micronesia (FSM), the Republic of the Marshall Islands (RMI), and the Republic of Palau. As a result, these countries are sometimes known as the Freely Associated States.

These nations, together with the Commonwealth of the Northern Mariana Islands, formerly comprised the Trust Territory of the Pacific Islands, a United Nations trusteeship administered by the United States Navy from 1947 to 1951 and by the US Department of the Interior from 1951 to 1986 (to 1994 for Palau).

The compact came into being as an extension of the US–UN territorial trusteeship agreement, which obliged the federal government of the United States "to promote the development of the people of the Trust Territory toward self-government or independence as appropriate to the particular circumstances of the Trust Territory and its peoples and the freely expressed wishes of the peoples concerned".  Under the compact, the US federal government provides guaranteed financial assistance over a 15-year period administered through its Office of Insular Affairs in exchange for full international defense authority and responsibilities.

The Compact of Free Association was initiated by negotiators in 1980 and signed by the parties in the years 1982 and 1983. It was approved by the citizens of the Pacific states in plebiscites held in 1983. Legislation on the compact was adopted by the US Congress in 1986 and signed into law on November 13, 1986.

Economic provisions
Each of the associated states actively participates in all Office of Insular Affairs technical assistance activities.  The US  gives only these countries access to many US domestic programs, including disaster response and recovery and hazard mitigation programs under the Federal Emergency Management Agency, some US Department of Education programs including the Pell Grant, and services provided by the National Weather Service, the United States Postal Service, the Federal Aviation Administration, the Federal Communications Commission, the Federal Deposit Insurance Corporation, and US representation to the International Frequency Registration Board of the International Telecommunication Union. The Compact area, while outside the customs area of the United States, is mainly duty-free for imports.

Most citizens of the associated states may live and work in the United States, and most US citizens and their spouses may live and work in the associated states. In 1996, the US Personal Responsibility and Work Opportunity Act removed Medicaid benefits for resident foreigners from the states, even after the five-year waiting period that most other resident aliens have.  However, in December 2020, Congress restored Medicaid for Compact of Free Association communities.

Military provisions
The COFA allows the United States to operate armed forces in Compact areas and to demand land for operating bases, subject to negotiation, and excludes the militaries of other countries without US permission.  The US in turn becomes responsible for protecting its affiliate countries and responsible for administering all international defense treaties and affairs, though it may not declare war on their behalf.  It is not allowed to use nuclear, chemical, or biological weapons in Palauan territory. In the territories of the Marshall Islands and the Federated States of Micronesia it is not allowed to store such weapons except in times of national emergency, state of war, or when necessary to defend against an actual or impending attack on the US, the Marshall Islands, or the Federated States of Micronesia.

Citizens of the associated states may serve in America's armed forces, and there is a high level of military enlistment by Compact citizens. For example, in 2008, the Federated States of Micronesia had a higher per-capita enlistment rate than any US state, and had more than five times the national per-capita average of casualties in Iraq and Afghanistan: 9 soldiers out of a population of 107,000.

21st-century renewal and updates
In 2003, the compacts with the RMI and FSM were renewed for 20 years.  These new compacts provided US$3.5 billion in funding for both countries.  US$30 million will also be disbursed annually among American Samoa, Guam, Hawaii, and the Northern Mariana Islands in "Compact Impact" funding.  This funding helps the governments of these localities cope with the expense of providing services to immigrants from the RMI, FSM, and Palau.  The US use of Kwajalein Atoll for missile testing was renewed for the same period.  The new compacts also changed certain immigration rules.  RMI and FSM citizens traveling to the US are now required to have passports.  The US Postal Service was given the option to apply international postage rates for mail between the US and RMI/FSM, phased in over five years.  The USPS began implementing the change in January 2006, but decided to resume domestic services and rates in November 2007.

The renewed compact, commonly called "Compact II", took effect for FSM on June 25, 2004, and for RMI on June 30, 2004.

The economic provisions of the Compact for Palau which provided $18 million in annual subsidies and grants, expired on September 30, 2009, and the renewal talk was concluded in late 2010. US financial support for Palau is based on a continuing resolution passed by the US Congress.  The Compact Trust Fund set up to replace US financial aid underperformed because of the Great Recession.  The military and civil defense provisions remained until 2015.

An amended Compact, enacted December 17, 2003, as Public Law 108-188, provided financial assistance to the Marshall Islands and Micronesia through 2023. The Compact of Free Association agreement with the Republic of Palau, enshrined in US Public Law 99-658, was followed by a Compact Review Agreement signed between the US and Palau in 2018, extending certain financial provisions through September 30, 2024.

In March 2022, President Joe Biden named Ambassador Joseph Yun as US Special Presidential Envoy for Compact Negotiations to take over negotiation for amendment and continuation of COFA.

Other potential CFA states
The former government of the United States unincorporated territory of Guam, led by Governor Eddie Calvo, campaigned for a plebiscite on Guam's future political status, with free association following the model of the Marshall Islands, Micronesia, and Palau as one of the possible options.

In Puerto Rico, the soberanista movement advocates for the territory to be granted a freely associated status. The 2017 status referendum presented "Independence/Free Association" as an option; if the majority of voters had chosen it, a second round of voting would have been held to choose between free association and full independence. In 2022, the US Congress introduced the Puerto Rico Status Act, which would hold a federally-sponsored referendum on the territory's status, with a free association status expected to be presented as an option.

US fulfillment of commitments 
The United States' administration of the former trust territories now covered under the Compacts of Free Association has been subject to ongoing criticism over the past several decades.  A 1961 United Nations mission report initially noted deficiencies in "American administration in almost every area:  poor transportation, failure to settle war damage claims; failure to adequately compensate for land taken for military purposes; poor living conditions[;] inadequate economic development; inadequate education programs; and almost nonexistent medical care."  In 1971, congresswoman Patsy Mink further noted that "[A]fter winning the right to control Micronesia, [the US] proceeded to allow the islands to stagnate and decay through indifference and lack of assistance. . . . [T]he people are still largely impoverished and lacking in all of the basic amenities which we consider essential – adequate education, housing, good health standards, modern sanitation facilities."

After the compacts, criticism was also received by the United States House Foreign Affairs Subcommittee on Asia and the Pacific regarding the unfulfilled commitments of the United States to address the impacts of US nuclear testing in the Marshall Islands, which were included as part of the Pacific Proving Grounds.  Speakers noted that while section 177 of the Compact of Free Association recognized the United States' responsibility "to address past, present and future consequences of the nuclear testing claims," less than $4 million was awarded out of a $2.2 billion judgment rendered by a Nuclear Claims Tribunal created under the RMI Compact, and the United States Court of Claims had dismissed two lawsuits to enforce the judgment. With respect to these unaddressed claims, medical practitioners also noted the potential widespread impacts of nuclear testing within the Pacific Proving Grounds, indicated by the prevalence of both radiogenic diseases, as well as heart disease, diabetes, and obesity associated with "[a] forced change in dietary patterns and lifestyle" resulting from US administration after the testing. In 2011, lawmakers further noted that the US Congress had continuously failed to cover the costs of promised medical care and services to displaced compact citizens who migrate to the United States for health care, education, and employment opportunities, particularly since the passage of the Personal Responsibility and Work Opportunity Act.

Questions regarding US responsibility have also been raised regarding the issue of numerous derelict war ships and oil tankers abandoned or destroyed by the US military in atolls and islands throughout the compact area.

Health care issues
In 2009, the state of Hawaii, under the administration of then-Governor Linda Lingle, attempted to restrict health care access for Compact citizens by eliminating all Compact residents of Hawaii from Med-QUEST, the state's comprehensive Medicaid coverage plan. COFA residents were instead subject to Basic Health Hawaii, a limited health care plan under which "transportation services are excluded and patients can receive no more than ten days of medically necessary inpatient hospital care per year, twelve outpatient visits per year, and a maximum of four medication prescriptions per calendar month. . . . BHH covers dialysis treatments as an emergency medical service only, and the approximate ten to twelve prescription medications dialysis patients take per month are not fully covered. BHH . . . caus[es] cancer patients to exhaust their allotted doctors' visits within two to three months".

Noting that such a policy likely constituted unlawful discrimination in violation of the Equal Protection Clause, federal District Court Judge John Michael Seabright issued a preliminary injunction against the implementation of Basic Health Hawaii. In finding a high likelihood of irreparable harm, Judge Seabright took note of the "compelling evidence that BHH's limited coverage . . . is causing COFA Residents to forego much needed treatment because they cannot otherwise afford it". Lingle's successor, Governor Neil Abercrombie continued the state's appeal of the injunction to the United States Court of Appeals for the Ninth Circuit, which ruled in favor of the state. When the United States Supreme Court refused to hear the case, the Abercrombie administration removed most COFA residents from Med-QUEST and transferred them onto Affordable Care Act plans. In other states, notably Arkansas, which has a significant population of Marshallese, COFA residents have not been eligible for Medicaid.

See also 
 Associated state
 Protectorate
 Territories of the United States
 Sovereigntism (Puerto Rico)

References

Footnotes

Bibliography
 
 "Micronesia, Marshall Islands and Palau" is found at:

External links 
 USCompact.org, USDOI Honolulu Field Office
 1986 Compact of Free Association between RMI and FSM
 Proclamation by Ronald Reagan about the 1986 COFA between RMI and FSM
 Pacific Islands Report:  Compacts of Free Association Renegotiations (includes the text of the 2003 RMI and FSM COFAs)

1986 in the Federated States of Micronesia
1986 in the Marshall Islands
1994 in Palau
Federated States of Micronesia–United States relations
Associated states
Government of Palau
Government of the Federated States of Micronesia
Government of the Marshall Islands
Marshall Islands–United States relations
Palau–United States relations
Treaties concluded in 1986
Treaties concluded in 1994
Treaties of Palau
Treaties of the Federated States of Micronesia
Treaties of the Marshall Islands
Treaties of the United States